The 2016 Hungarian Athletics Championships were the 121st edition of the Hungarian Athletics Championships, which took place on 29–31 July 2016 at the Regionális Atlétikai Központ in Székesfehérvár.

Schedule

Day 1 (29 July)

Day 2 (30 July)

Day 3 (31 July)

Results

Men's events

Track

Field

Women's events

Track

Field

See also
Hungarian Athletics Championships
Hungarian Athletics Association

References

External links 
  of the Magyar Atlétikai Szövetség (MASZ; Hungarian Athletics Association) 
 Full results 

2016
2016 in athletics (track and field)
Athletics Championships